Izvor is a village in Southern Bulgaria in Rodopi Municipality, Plovdiv Province. The total population count of the village as per June 2020's national census was 56 people.

Geography 
Izvor is one of the more touristically-attractive villages in Rodopi Municipality. It is located 17 kilometers South from the town at 550 meters elevation above sea level in Rhodope Mountains. There are 12 chapels in the village and one church "Sveti Iliya". Another popular tourist attraction in the village are the two well-preserved Roman Empire bridges.

The total area of the village is over 20,000 hectares. The majority of which are forests. There are interesting sediments and geomorphological formations. The largest such rock in the region can be found near the river Izvorska.

The church was built in 1925. According to local villagers and media the village is a common spot for treasure seekers to survey.

Ethnicity

According to the 2011 census

Population Count of Izvor during the years

References 

Towns in Bulgaria